Nicoline Søndergaard Jensen (born 8 November 1992) is a Danish ice hockey player and alternate captain of the Danish national ice hockey team, currently serving as captain of the Rødovre Mighty Bulls Q in the KvindeLigaen.

Jensen has represented Denmark at eleven IIHF Women's World Championships, including at the Top Division tournament in 2021, and in the women's ice hockey tournament at the 2022 Winter Olympics in Beijing.

Playing career 
She went on to play in the Swedish Damettan with the Malmö Redhawks Dam and in the United States with the Castleton Spartans women's ice hockey program in the NCAA Division III and with the New Hampshire Wildcats women's ice hockey program in the NCAA Division I.  Active in the Swedish Women's Hockey League (SDHL) during 2016 to 2022, she played with Linköping HC Dam, Luleå HF/MSSK, and HV71 Dam.

References

External links 
 
 
 

Living people
1992 births
People from Tårnby Municipality
Danish women's ice hockey forwards
HV71 Dam players
Luleå HF/MSSK players
Linköping HC Dam players
New Hampshire Wildcats women's ice hockey players
Danish expatriate ice hockey people
Danish expatriate sportspeople in Sweden
Danish expatriate sportspeople in the United States
Expatriate ice hockey players in Sweden
Expatriate ice hockey players in the United States
Ice hockey players at the 2022 Winter Olympics
Olympic ice hockey players of Denmark
Sportspeople from the Capital Region of Denmark